Creag Rainich (807 m) is a remote mountain in the Northwest Highlands, Scotland, southwest of Ullapool. An isolated peak, its position provides fine views from its summit.

References

Mountains and hills of the Northwest Highlands
Marilyns of Scotland
Corbetts